K.C (or K.C.) is a surname anglicized as an abbreviation of Khatri Chhetri. The surname Khatri was historically legally labelled to the children of Brahmin fathers and Kshatriya (Chhetri) mothers after the introduction of Muluki Ain (the Legal Code of Nepal) in 1854 by Jang Bahadur Rana of Nepal.

History 
Dislodged by the Ghurid conquest of India and subsequent Delhi Sultanate, Brahmins from Rajasthan, Gujarat, Punjab and North India began emigrating to the hills of western Nepal seeking refuge primarily after the 12th century where they encountered another Indo-Aryan tribe called Khasas. The progeny resulting from the unions of Brahmin men and Khas women were called Khatris. 

In contrast to the British rule in India and subsequent British Raj, Jang Bahadur Rana promulgated the legal code of Nepal called Muluki Ain in 1854 enforcing rigid social and matrimonial structures within Hinduism where the patriline of a caste and thereby the status of children legally depended upon the marriage choice of the father. As per this, the children born from the marriage of a Brahmin father and a Kshatriya (Chhetri) mother were labelled as "Khatri or Khatri Chhetri", indicating that they were the descendants of a marriage between a Brahmin man with a Chhetri woman in their ascendant patriline.

Notable KCs 

 Arjun Narasingha K.C., former five-times minister of Nepal and Senior Nepali Congress Leader
 Chitra Bahadur K.C., former Deputy Prime Minister of Nepal & Chairman of the Rashtriya Jana Morcha Party
 Dr. Govinda K.C., Nepalese orthopaedic surgeon and philanthropic activist
 Kul Bahadur KC, late Nepalese Poet and laureate
 Dr. Kedar Narsingh KC, former Director of the National Tuberculosis Center and President of Nepal Medical Association
 Kul Prasad KC, Chief Minister of Lumbini Province of Nepal
 Sugarika KC, former Miss Nepal 
 Karishma K.C. (Manandhar), one of the most prominent Nepalese actress 
 Nandita K.C., Nepalese actress
 Atithi Gautam K. C, youngest singer in the world to release a professional solo album
 Hira Chandra KC, State Minister of Health and Population of Nepal
 Bhuwan K.C., Nepalese actor, director, producer, singer and filmmaker
 Sarala KC, President of Nepal Nursing Council
 Sher Bahadur KC, former President of Nepal Bar Association
 Rajendra Kumar KC, former minister of Nepal and leader of Nepali Congress Party 
 Dr. Badri KC, President of Non Resident Nepali Association (NRNA)
 Dr. Nagendra Bahadur KC, former Major general (Nepali Army) and Director general of Nepalese Army Institute of Health Sciences 
 Neelam KC, President of Women's International League for Peace and Freedom (WILPF-Nepal) 
 Anmol K.C., actor and producer
 Buddhi Bahadur KC, Executive Director of state-owned Radio Nepal
 Surya Bahadur KC, former Chairman of Machhapuchhre Bank Ltd
 Bal Bahadur K.C., former minister of Nepal
 Sunil KC, Chief Executive Officer (CEO) of NMB Bank Nepal
 Ramesh Kumar KC, Chairman of Agricultural Development Bank of Nepal
 Dr. Fatta Bahadur KC, former Chairman of National Insurance Board of Nepal (Rastriya Beema Sansthan)
 Roshan KC, former Chairman of Machhapuchhre Bank Ltd
 Jagadiswar Narsingh KC, former member of the 1st and 2nd Constituent Assembly of Nepal
 Kiran KC, prominent comedian and actor of Nepal
 Manoj Kumar KC, band member of 1974 AD
 Dhruba KC, former coach of Nepal national football team
 Karan KC, Nepalese national professional cricketer
Anjan KC, national football player of Nepal
Rupesh KC, national football player of Nepal
Jenisha KC, Nepalese actress appearing in Nepalese and Bhojpuri Films
Sandhya KC, Nepalese actress
Sushil KC, national football player of Nepal

Citations 

Surnames of Nepalese origin